CLRV may refer to:

 Canadian Light Rail Vehicle, a type of streetcar that is used in Toronto, Canada
 Cherry leaf roll virus, a plant pathogenic virus